Valery Ustyuzhin (1945 – 2 September 2010) was a Soviet heavyweight weightlifter. In 1974, he won the Soviet, European and world titles. He set two world records in the Clean and Jerk, in both 1973 and 1974.

References

1945 births
2010 deaths
Sportspeople from Rivne
Soviet male weightlifters
European Weightlifting Championships medalists
World Weightlifting Championships medalists